"It's Sad to Belong" is a song written by Randy Goodrum and performed by England Dan & John Ford Coley on their 1977 album, Dowdy Ferry Road. Called a "timeless classic", it peaked at #21 on the Billboard Hot 100 chart and #1 on the easy listening chart. It was one of the earlier pop hits in Goodrum's career.

"It's Sad to Belong" was released in May 1977 through Big Tree Records, with the b-side "The Time Has Come". It became one of "a string of hit singles" that England Dan & John Ford Coley had in the mid-1970s.

The song topped the adult contemporary (then called "easy listening") chart for five consecutive weeks from June 25 to July 23.  It also appeared on the top 40 "rack singles" list on June 7. On December 24, it ranked #3 on Billboard'''s end-of-the-year easy listening chart.

Background
"It's Sad to Belong" is the second track on Dowdy Ferry Road. It is one of only two songs on the album not written by either singer.

The song has been called "bittersweet", telling the story of a married man falling in love with another woman and knowing they cannot be together. Dale Van Atta of the Deseret News observed that it is "the universal divorce anthem - about the alleged monotony of monogamy" and that the duo "[reduces] it to a simple, peaceful chorus" (referring to the line, Yes, it's sad to belong to someone else when the right one comes along).Billboard described the song as a "sweetly catchy ballad."  Cash Box said "the strong point is their seamless harmony, easing a catchy chorus through several refrains." Record World'' said that "the latest single by this duo deals with the 'trying to love two' theme in a way that should find listeners in pop, MOR and country formats in short order."

It is still performed in concerts by the surviving member of the duo, John Ford Coley.

Chart performance

Weekly charts

Year-end charts

Other versions
B.J. Thomas recorded a version of "It's Sad to Belong" in 1977 on his eponymous LP.

See also
List of number-one adult contemporary singles of 1977 (U.S.)

References

External links
 

1977 singles
England Dan & John Ford Coley songs
Songs written by Randy Goodrum
1977 songs
Big Tree Records singles